Austrosomatidia pulleni is a species of beetle in the family Cerambycidae, and the only species in the genus Austrosomatidia. It was described by McKeown in 1945.

References

Parmenini
Beetles described in 1945